CCGS Corporal McLaren M.M.V. is the sixth vessel of the Canadian Coast Guard's s. The ship entered service in 2013, tasked with enforcing Canadian maritime law within Canada's nautical borders. The ship was the subject of sabotage in 2018 and is under repair.

Description
The patrol vessel is also equipped with two Northern Lights M1066 generators and one Northern Lights M1064 emergency generator. The ship has a complement of nine with five officers and four crew and has five additional berths. The ship is equipped with Sperry Marine Visionmaster FT navigational radar operating on the X and S-bands.

Construction and career
The sixth vessel of the Canadian Coast Guard's  was laid down on 13 July 2012 by Halifax Shipyard at Halifax, Nova Scotia with the yard number 6099. Named Corporal McLaren M.M.V. for a soldier of the Canadian Army who displayed great valour during the War in Afghanistan was killed in the line of duty, the ship was launched on 13 September 2013. The patrol vessel was completed on 26 October 2013 and entered service that year.

Corporal McLaren M.M.V. is registered in Ottawa, Ontario and based at Dartmouth, Nova Scotia. The patrol vessel is used primarily for enforcing Canadian maritime law within Canada's nautical borders. In May 2016 Corporal McLaren M.M.V. was taken out of service to address corrosion on stern plates. 

While undergoing a refit at Sambro, Nova Scotia, on 17 November 2018 Corporal McLaren M.M.V. was released from the vessel's cradle, allegedly due to vandalism. The vessel slid down the slip and lay partially submerged in the water, though the damage was light. The ship was refloated on 26 November 2018 and taken to a dock in Sambro where the full extent of the damage was assessed. In the aftermath, the Canadian Coast Guard cut ties with Canadian Maritime Engineering, the shipyard performing the repair work at the time of the sabotage. The Government of Canada budgeted CAD$11 million for the repair of Corporal McLaren M.M.V. with no timeline on the vessel's return to service.

Citations

References
 
 

Hero-class patrol vessels
2013 ships
Ships built in Nova Scotia
Patrol vessels of the Canadian Coast Guard